This is a list of the administrative heads of Christmas Island since 1 October 1958, when it became an external territory of the Commonwealth of Australia.

See also

List of administrative heads of the Cocos (Keeling) Islands
Administrator's House, Christmas Island

References

External links
World StatesmenChristmas Island

Christmas Island administrative heads
 
History of Christmas Island
History of the Cocos (Keeling) Islands